The 1942 Niksar–Erbaa earthquake in Turkey occurred at 16:03 local time on 20 December. It had an estimated surface wave magnitude of 7.0 and a maximum felt intensity of IX (Violent) on the Mercalli intensity scale, causing 3,000 casualties.

See also 
List of earthquakes in 1942
List of earthquakes in Turkey

References

External links

1942 Niksar
1942 earthquakes
1942 in Turkey
History of Tokat Province
December 1942 events
1942 disasters in Turkey